Ng Siu Ching  (born 1968) is a former wushu taolu athlete from Hong Kong. She achieved an extensive medal record in international competition, becoming the first taolu athlete to win five gold medals at the World Wushu Championships. Ng also had multiple victories in the Asian Games and the East Asian Games.

Career 
Born in Jiangxi, Ng moved to Hong Kong in 1986. Her first major international appearance was at the 1990 Asian Games in Beijing, China, where she won the bronze medal in the women's changquan all-around event. A year later, she competed in the 1991 World Wushu Championships also in Beijing and won three silver medals in changquan, jianshu, and qiangshu. Two years later, she competed in the 1993 East Asian Games in Shanghai, China, and won a silver medal in the women's changquan all-around event and a bronze medal in nanquan. A few months later, she competed in the 1993 World Wushu Championships in Kuala Lumpur, Malaysia and won silver medals in jianshu and nanquan and a bronze medal in qiangshu. A year later, she competed in the 1994 Asian Games and won the bronze medal in women's nanquan. At the 1995 World Wushu Championships in Baltimore, USA, Ng won her first gold medals in international competition, becoming world champion in nanquan and qiangshu and also winning a bronze medal in jianshu. For her final competition representing British Hong Kong, she won the gold medal in women's nanquan at the 1997 East Asian Games. 

Representing the SAR of Hong Kong, Ng first competed at the 1997 World Wushu Championships in Rome, Italy, where she was the world champion in nanquan and qiangshu, and also won a silver medal in jianshu. She then won a gold medal in women's nanquan at the 1998 Asian Games in Bangkok, Thailand, making her become the first athlete from Hong Kong to receive a wushu gold medal in the Asian Games. For her last competition, Ng competed at the 1999 World Wushu Championships in Hong Kong where she was the gold champion in nanquan and additionally won a bronze medal in qiangshu. After announcing her retirement, she moved to the United States to pursue a degree in sports at Springfield College.

Awards 
Awarded by the Hong Kong SAR Government:

 Medal of Honour (1998)

See also 

 List of Asian Games medalists in wushu
World Wushu Championships § Statistics

References 

1968 births
Living people
Hong Kong wushu practitioners
Chinese wushu practitioners
Asian Games gold medalists for Hong Kong
Asian Games bronze medalists for Hong Kong
Wushu practitioners at the 1990 Asian Games
Wushu practitioners at the 1994 Asian Games
Wushu practitioners at the 1998 Asian Games
Medalists at the 1990 Asian Games
Medalists at the 1994 Asian Games
Medalists at the 1998 Asian Games
Asian Games medalists in wushu
Springfield College (Massachusetts) alumni